The West Trenton Railroad Bridge is a concrete arch bridge carrying CSX's Trenton Subdivision and SEPTA's West Trenton Line across the Delaware River between Lower Makefield Township in Bucks County, Pennsylvania and the West Trenton section of Ewing Township in Mercer County, New Jersey.  It was originally designed by the Philadelphia and Reading Railroad and was constructed from 1911 to 1913 by the F. W. Talbot Construction Company.

The masonry piers alongside this bridge carried the original 1875 wrought-iron truss bridge (Yardleyville Centennial Bridge).

See also
 List of bridges documented by the Historic American Engineering Record in Pennsylvania

References

External links
 
 1875 Philadelphia Centennial Railroad Bridge at Yardleyville

Bridges completed in 1913
Bridges in Bucks County, Pennsylvania
Bridges in Mercer County, New Jersey
Bridges over the Delaware River
CSX Transportation bridges
Reading Railroad bridges
Railroad bridges in New Jersey
Railroad bridges in Pennsylvania
Historic American Engineering Record in Pennsylvania
1913 establishments in New Jersey
1913 establishments in Pennsylvania
Viaducts in the United States
Concrete bridges in the United States
Interstate railroad bridges in the United States

SEPTA Regional Rail